Yataqoba (also, Yatagoba) is a village and municipality in the Khachmaz Rayon of Azerbaijan.  It has a population of 1,045.  The municipality consists of the villages of Yataqoba, Krasnı Xutor, and Mecidoba.

References 

Populated places in Khachmaz District